Burdock refers to Arctium, a genus of plants, particularly the species:
Arctium lappa, or "Greater burdock", a vegetable often referred to by the Japanese name gobō

Burdock may also refer to:

Fictional characters
Bardock or Burdock, a character in Dragon Ball media
Fred Burdock, a character in the E/R universe

Places
Burdock, South Dakota

Other uses
Burdock piling, a Japanese construction technique
Dandelion and burdock, a traditional British soft drink
Burdocks (music), a contemporary musical work by Christian Wolff (composer)

People with the surname
Jack Burdock (1852–1931), American baseball player
Leo Burdocks, Dublin's oldest fish and chip shop

See also
Burdick (disambiguation)
Burdak